Tansen Durbar, also known as Palpa Durbar & Museum, is a historical palace and a museum. It was built in 1927 by Pratap Shamsher Jang Bahadur Rana. The Durbar is a grand palace in the town of Tansen, Nepal. It was the seat of the Rana governors during the Rana rule in Nepal.

The palace was destroyed in 2005 by Maoists in the Nepalese Civil War and was rebuilt and reopened in 2008.

Gallery

See also
Rana palaces of Nepal
Kaiser Mahal
Jaulakhel Durbar
Singha Durbar
Rani Mahal

References

Rana palaces of Nepal
Buildings and structures in Palpa District
Tansen, Nepal
1927 establishments in Nepal